Éteignières is a commune in the Ardennes department in the Grand Est region in northern France.

Geography
The river Sormonne forms most of the commune's northern border.

Population

See also
 Communes of the Ardennes department

References

Communes of Ardennes (department)
Ardennes communes articles needing translation from French Wikipedia